Religious views on the self vary widely. The self is a complex and core subject in many forms of spirituality. Considering the self leads to questions about who we are and the nature of our own importance.

General discussion
According to psychologist James Marcia, identity comes from both political and religious views. Marcia also identified exploration and commitment as interactive parts of identity formation, which includes religious identity. Erik Erikson compared faith with doubt and found that healthy adults take heed to their spiritual side.

One description of spirituality is the self's search for "ultimate meaning" through an independent comprehension of the sacred. Spiritual identity appears when the symbolic religious and spiritual of a culture is found by individuals in the setting of their own life. There can be different types of spiritual self because it is determined on one's life and experiences. Another definition of spiritual identity is " a persistent sense of self that addresses ultimate questions about the nature, purpose, and meaning of life, resulting in behaviors that are consonant with the individual’s core values." Another description of mind, body, soul, and spirit is a holism of one inner self being of one whole. It all combines together as one whole instead of different parts. Individuals one thoughts, one feeling, one breathing is all completed and occurs as one whole.

Views in Eastern religions
Some Eastern philosophies reject the self as a delusion. In Buddhist psychology, the attachment to self is an illusion that serves as the main cause of suffering and unhappiness.

Christian views

Evelyn Underhill
Catholic mystic Evelyn Underhill wrote:

Albert Outler
According to Methodist theologian Albert Outler, the "desperately wicked self" is the sinful self that has chosen to be "curved back upon itself", but ever with the potential of changing and (by God's grace) turning toward "'new life', opened out to love of God and neighbor".

Ken Wilber's view
American author Ken Wilber describes the Witnessing (or Observing) Self in the following terms: 
"This observing Self is usually called the Self with a capital S, or the Witness, or pure Presence, or pure Awareness, or Consciousness as such, and this Self as transparent Witness is a direct ray of the living Divine. The ultimate "I AM" is Christ, is Buddha, is Emptiness itself: such is the startling testimony of the world's great mystics and sages."

He adds that the self is not an Emergent, but an aspect present from the start as the basic form of awareness, but which becomes increasingly obvious and self-aware  "as growth and transcendence matures." As Depth increases, consciousness shines forth more noticeably, until:
"shed[ding] its lesser identification with both the body and the mind ... in each case from matter to body to mind to Spirit... consciousness or the observing Self sheds an exclusive identity with a lesser and shallower dimension, and opens up to deeper and higher and wider occasions, until it opens up to its own ultimate ground in Spirit itself. And the stages of transpersonal growth and development are basically the stages of following this Observing Self to its ultimate abode, which is pure Spirit or pure Emptiness, the ground, path and fruition of the entire display."

See also

 Anattā
 Aseity
 Ātman (Buddhism)
 Ātman (Hinduism)
 Sakshi (Witness)
 Tat tvam asi
 Holy Guardian Angel (Thelema)
 Jiva
 Nondualism
 Philosophy of self
 Psychology of self
 Saṃsāra
 Soul
 Tazkiah

References

Conceptions of self
Religious existentialism